(born August 5, 1986) is a former Japanese Artistic gymnast. She is a double Olympian, competing at the 2004 and 2008 Olympic Games and has competed at 8 world championship events, the most by any Japanese female gymnast.

References

Japanese female artistic gymnasts
1986 births
Living people
Olympic gymnasts of Japan
Gymnasts at the 2004 Summer Olympics
Gymnasts at the 2008 Summer Olympics
Asian Games medalists in gymnastics
Gymnasts at the 2002 Asian Games
Gymnasts at the 2006 Asian Games
Gymnasts at the 2010 Asian Games
Asian Games silver medalists for Japan
Asian Games bronze medalists for Japan
Medalists at the 2002 Asian Games
Medalists at the 2006 Asian Games
Medalists at the 2010 Asian Games
Universiade medalists in gymnastics
Universiade gold medalists for Japan
Medalists at the 2011 Summer Universiade
Gymnasts from Tokyo
20th-century Japanese women
21st-century Japanese women